The Dad Vail Regatta is the largest regular intercollegiate rowing event in the United States, drawing over a hundred colleges and universities from North America. The regatta has been held annually on the Schuylkill River in Philadelphia, Pennsylvania, since 1953.

It was renamed the Jefferson Dad Vail Regatta in 2019 for new sponsor Thomas Jefferson University, a private university in Philadelphia, Pennsylvania, formed in 2017 through the merger of Philadelphia University and Thomas Jefferson University.

It was renamed the Aberdeen Dad Vail Regatta in 2010 for sponsor Aberdeen Asset Management, a Scottish investment firm whose U.S. operations are headquartered in Center City Philadelphia.

The purposes of the Dad Vail Rowing Association are: "to perpetuate the 'Dad' Vail tradition, foster and encourage intercollegiate rowing among colleges new to the sport, and promote schedules for member schools."

Origin of the name "Dad Vail"
The regatta was named after Harry Emerson "Dad" Vail, for his years of coaching at the University of Wisconsin–Madison.

The story of the Dad Vail Regatta, and of the Rowing Association, begins with two men, "Rusty" Callow, then coach at the University of Pennsylvania, who came up with the idea, and Lev Brett, who made the idea a reality.

Callow originated the idea of promoting competition among colleges struggling to found rowing programs. These included schools too small to hope to ever compete in major races and larger institutions not yet ready for such competition.  In order to create competition, Rusty created a trophy as the competition prize, in 1934, which was named in honor of Vail.

Since then, the name "Dad" Vail has become one and the same with the race. Vail's passion for rowing helped form the modern-day Dad Vail Regatta and motivate the multitudes of colleges to come compete.

History of the regatta
The first race, before the formation of the Dad Vail Rowing Association, was held in 1934 with "Rusty" and the University of Pennsylvania as hosts. Marietta College, coached by Ellis MacDonald won the first leg on the new trophy by finishing second to a Penn sub-varsity boat, which was an added entry. Rutgers, coached by Ned Ten Eyck, was third and Manhattan College, coached by "Skippy" Walz was fourth.

The race in 1935 was at Marietta.  With the addition of Rollins College and Wisconsin, the order at the finish of the race was: Rutgers, Penn, Marietta, Wisconsin, Manhattan, and Rollins. There was no race held in 1937.  In both 1936 and 1938, only Rutgers and Manhattan competed on the Harlem.  Rutgers won both times. In February 1939, a meeting was held and the Dad Vail Rowing Association was formed in order to help promote the race and encourage schools to compete.

The growth of the regatta is pointed out by the following statistics: in the first association regatta, seven colleges sent seven varsity crews to Red Bank. At Philadelphia in 1961, twenty colleges sent forty crews to compete in varsity, JV, and freshman races. Currently, over a hundred colleges and universities from the United States and Canada compete, making the Dad Vail Regatta the largest collegiate regatta in the United States and bringing thousands of student athletes to Philadelphia.

Women competed for the first time in 1976. As coxswain for Marietta College's JV heavyweight eight that year, Deborah Patterson was the first woman to win a gold medal at the Dad Vail.

Briefly in late 2009, the Dad Vail Organizing Committee announced that the regatta would be held in Rumson, New Jersey in 2010, citing loss of local sponsors. However, this decision was soon rescinded due to pressure from the city and logistical problems with the Rumson location, and the event returned to Philadelphia for 2010.

The Dad Vail entered its 75th year in 2013.

Winners of select events

Points trophies
The regatta awards trophies for men's, women's, and overall points based on the following scheme:

See also
Boathouse Row
Sports in Philadelphia

References

External links

History of the regatta

1953 establishments in Pennsylvania
Recurring sporting events established in 1953
Sports in Philadelphia
Row
College rowing competitions in the United States